Aboso Glass Factory is a glass company located in Aboso, a town near Tarkwa, which is the capital of Wassa West District, in the Western Region of Ghana.

History 
The Aboso Glass Factory set up by Dr. Kwame Nkrumah in 1966, was a major manufacturer and supplier of bottles for the beverage industry, among many other products. Most of the employees were residents from Aboso and other neighbouring communities. The company was renamed as Tropical Glass Factory when it was handed over to Mr. Gilchrist Olympio. However due to financial constraints, the company collapsed. In 2003, Aboso Glass Factory was placed on a divestiture listing, after ECG ceased power supply for their works.  The government in 2017 has announced plans of restoring the company to its former glory with the help of some investors.  In 2019, GIHOC Distilleries Company Limited declared a takeover of the Aboso Glass Factory.

References

Glassmaking companies
Ghanaian brands
Western Region (Ghana)
1966 establishments in Ghana